Reviews in Mineralogy and Geochemistry is the official review journal of the Mineralogical Society of America and The Geochemical Society. It was established in 1974 as Mineralogical Society of America Short Course Notes and renamed to Reviews in Mineralogy in 1980. It obtained its present name in 2000.

Abstracting and indexing 
The journal is abstracted and indexed in GeoRef, Scopus, and Science Citation Index Expanded.

References

External links 
 

Publications established in 1974
English-language journals
Mineralogy
Geology journals
Irregular journals
Geochemical Society